Jaime Pradilla Gayán (born 3 January 2001) is a Spanish basketball player for Valencia of the Spanish Liga ACB and the EuroLeague. He also represents Spain national team in international competitions.

Professional career 
Born in Zaragoza, Pradilla played in the youth ranks of Basket Zaragoza. At age 16, he made his debut for the farm team Simply Olivar in the Liga EBA, the Spanish fourth-tier.

On 29 September 2018, Pradilla debuted in the Liga ACB with Zaragoza and became the second player born in the 21st century to play in the league. He scored 2 points in 10 minutes in the away loss to Baskonia.

In August 2019, he was sent on loan to Palencia Baloncesto.

In July 2020, Pradilla signed a four-year contract with Valencia Basket.

National team career 
Pradilla debuted for Spain on 26 November 2021. He also played at EuroBasket 2022 with Spain and won the gold medal.

References

External links 

Spanish men's basketball players
Palencia Baloncesto players
Valencia Basket players
People from Zaragoza
2001 births
Living people
Power forwards (basketball)